Hamidreza Divsalar is an Iranian football midfielder.

Career
He started his career with Rah Ahan in 2008 and made his debut for Rah Ahan against Mes Kerman. In the winter of 2012, he joined Paykan.

Club career statistics

References

External links 
Hamidreza Divsalar  at PersianLeague.com

Iranian footballers
Association football midfielders
Rah Ahan players
Gostaresh Foulad F.C. players
Malavan players
Paykan F.C. players
1990 births
Living people
Iran under-20 international footballers
People from Nur, Iran
Sportspeople from Mazandaran province